Helena Beatson (1762–1839) was an amateur pastellist from Scotland.

Born in Kilrie, Fife, Beatson was the daughter of writer Robert Beatson and niece of artist Catherine Read, who produced two portraits of her in addition to being her teacher. A child prodigy, she submitted, anonymously, a set of "sketches by a child of eight years old" to the Society of Artists in 1771; they were singled out for praise by Horace Walpole. Two drawings of gypsies and dancers were exhibited at the Royal Academy in 1774, in which year Fanny Burney visited her and her aunt and pronounced the child "a most astonishing genius, though never taught...a very wonderful girl".

Beatson was quite well-travelled, visiting Charleston, South Carolina in 1772 — a trip which attracted notice in the local Gazette — and traveling with Read to India a few years later. In 1777, while there, she married Sir Charles Oakeley, 1st Baronet, later governor of Madras. The next year she gave birth to a son, also named Charles, and seems to have abandoned art thereafter.

Lady Oakeley died at Lichfield Palace.

References

1762 births
1839 deaths
18th-century Scottish painters
18th-century Scottish women artists
19th-century Scottish painters
19th-century Scottish women artists
British people in colonial India
Pastel artists
People from Fife
Scottish women painters
Wives of baronets